Ston is a village and municipality in Croatia.

Ston may also refer to
Mali Ston, a village in Croatia
Roman Catholic Diocese of Ston, in Croatia
Ston Easton, a village and civil parish in England
Ston Easton Park
Tjakkatjakka Ston, an abandoned village in Suriname
 STON, an abbreviation for a former name of the Soviet Solovki prison camp
 Ston (Martian crater)

See also 
 Stone (disambiguation)
 Stonne, a commune in France